Piuro (Piür in the local dialect) is a comune (municipality) in the Province of Sondrio in the Italian region Lombardy, located about  north of Milan and about  northwest of Sondrio, on the border with Switzerland.

The municipality of Piuro contains the frazione (subdivision) Savogno.

Piuro borders the following municipalities: Avers (Switzerland), Campodolcino, Chiavenna, Ferrera (Switzerland), Madesimo, Novate Mezzola, Prata Camportaccio, San Giacomo Filippo, Soglio (Switzerland), Villa di Chiavenna.

On September 4, 1618, Piuro (then belonging to the Three Leagues) was the site of one of the worst landslides in recorded history. The event, described as an avalanche (somewhat inaccurately as it was more probably a mudslide), completely wiped out Piuro and killed between 1,000 and 2,500 people.

Demographic evolution

References

External links
 www.piuro.net

Cities and towns in Lombardy
Val Bregaglia
Landslides in Italy
Landslides in 1618